Soul Is... Pretty Purdie is an album led by R&B drummer Bernard Purdie which was recorded for the Flying Dutchman label in 1972.

Reception

The Allmusic site awarded the album 4½ stars.

Track listing
 "What's Going On/Ain't No Sunshine" (Renaldo Benson, Al Cleveland, Marvin Gaye/Bill Withers) – 3:58  
 "Don't Go" (Bernard "Pretty" Purdie) – 3:15  
 "Good Livin' (Good Lovin')" (Horace Ott) – 3:35  
 "Day Dreaming" (Aretha Franklin) – 5:05  
 "Song for Aretha" (Ott, Purdie, Bob Thiele) – 7:30  
 "Put It Where You Want It" (Joe Sample) – 5:15  
 "Heavy Soul Slinger" (Ott) – 4:16

Personnel
Bernard Purdie – drums, vocals
Danny Moore, Ernie Royal – trumpet (tracks 2 & 5)
Garnett Brown – trombone (tracks 2 & 5) 
Jimmy Powell – alto saxophone (tracks 2 & 5)
Charlie Brown (tracks 1, 3, 4, 6 & 7), Harold Vick (tracks 2 & 5), Seldon Powell (tracks 2 & 5) – tenor saxophone 
Arthur Clarke – baritone saxophone (tracks 2 & 5) 
Cornell Dupree (tracks 2 & 5), Jay Berliner (tracks 2 & 5), Billy Nichols (tracks 1, 3, 4, 6 & 7), Lloyd Davis (tracks 1, 3, 4, 6 & 7) – guitar 
Horace Ott – electric piano, piano, arranger, conductor 
Paul Griffin (tracks 1, 4 & 6), Richard Tee (Tracks 2 & 5) – organ 
Jerry Jemmott (tracks 2 & 5), Paul Martinez – electric bass (tracks 1, 3, 4, 6 & 7) 
Norman Pride – congas, bongos 
Gayle Dixon, Julien Barber, Noel DaCosta, Sanford Allen  – violin (tracks 2 & 5)
Alfred Brown, Selwart Clarke – viola (tracks 2 & 5)
Kermit Moore, Ronald Lipscomb – cello (tracks 2 & 5) 
Ralph MacDonald – bongos (track 2 & 5)
Gordon Powell – percussion (tracks 2 & 5) 
Barbara Massey, Carl Hall, Eileen Gilbert, Hilda Harris, Maeretha Stewart – backing vocals (track 5)

Production
 Bob Thiele – producer
 Bob Simpson and Tony May – engineer

Sample use

 "Good Livin' (Good Lovin')" has been sampled in "3 Kilos" by The Prodigy, from their album Music for the Jilted Generation (1994).
 "Song for Aretha" has been sampled by Beck in the song "Hotwax" from his 1996 album Odelay'.
 "Heavy Soul Slinger" has been sampled in "Poison" by The Prodigy, from their album Music for the Jilted Generation (1994), and by Massive Attack in the song Mezzanine'' from the eponymous 1998 album.

References

Bernard Purdie albums
1972 albums
Flying Dutchman Records albums
Albums arranged by Horace Ott
Albums produced by Bob Thiele